The 1887 Dartmouth football team represented Dartmouth College as a member of the Eastern Intercollegiate Football Association (EIFA) during the 1887 college football season. Dartmouth compiled an overall record of 3–1–1 with a mark of 2–1–1 in EIFA play.

Schedule

References

Dartmouth
Dartmouth Big Green football seasons
Dartmouth football